Prickett–Grooms Field,  is a privately owned public use airport located 1 mile (2 km) northeast of the central business district of Sidnaw, Michigan, a community in Houghton County, Michigan, United States.

Although most airports in the United States use the same three-letter location identifier for the FAA and International Air Transport Association (IATA), this airport is assigned 6Y9 by the FAA but has no designation from the IATA.

History
The Sidnaw Airport has been in existence (as a sod field) since at least 1944. It was closed by the state of Michigan in 2004, and was re-opened under auspices of a private group in July 2006. It was bought in 2006 by the Southern Houghton County Airport and Heritage Association who currently own and operate the field, as a public-use (daytime only) general-aviation facility. It is considered "closed" during winter months, or at other periods if snow is on the runway.

Facilities and aircraft
Prickett–Grooms Field covers an area of 46 acres (19 ha) at an elevation of 1372 feet (418 m) above mean sea level. It has one runway, oriented nearly east-west: 10/28 is 2,600 (2200 feet usable for landing) by 100 feet (792 x 30 m) with a turf surface.

For the 12-month period ending December 31, 2017, the airport had 150 aircraft operations; all general aviation. In November 2021, no aircraft were based at this airport (due to its "closed" status during winter weather months).

See also
 List of airports in Michigan
 List of airports in Michigan's Upper Peninsula

References

External links
 

Airports in Michigan
Buildings and structures in Houghton County, Michigan
Airports in the Upper Peninsula of Michigan
Transportation in Houghton County, Michigan